Cottin may refer to:

People 

 Alfred Cottin (1868–1922), guitarist and author
 Camille Cottin (born 1978), French actress
 Cyrille Cottin I (1838–1905), French business person (silk business).
 Cyrille Cottin II (1870–1942), French industrialist and racing driver
 Émile Cottin (1896–1936), French anarchist and attempted assassin
 Jacques Cottin, French costume designer
 Jules Cottin (1868–1922), mandolinist, composer and author
 Madeleine Cottin (1868–1922), mandolinist, author
 Sophie Cottin (1770–1807), French writer
 Letty Cottin Pogrebin (born 1939), American feminist writer and journalist

Other 
 Cottin & Desgouttes, French automobile manufacturer from the beginning of the 20th century